Chintalapati Srinivasa Raju is an Indian Entrepreneur and Private equity Investor. Srini Raju was the founding Chief Executive Officer (CEO) and managing director (MD) of Dun & Bradstreet Satyam Software,  the in-house technology unit of Dun & Bradstreet, established in 1994, which focused on implementing large-scale IT projects for Dun & Bradstreet businesses. DBSS was later renamed Cognizant.

Srini later became the Co-founder and Chairman of  iLabs Venture Capital Fund, a Private equity firm based in Hyderabad. Besides funding and mentoring next generation entrepreneurs, he plays an active role in building Educational Institutions of higher learning.

Early life and education 
Srini Raju was born in 1961 at Khajipalem village, Guntur District, Andhra Pradesh. His father, Anjiraju Chintalapati was a farmer. After completing his school education, he went to the National Institute of Technology, Kurukshetra and graduated in 1983 with an Honours Degree, BE (Civil Engineering). In 1986 he received his master's degree in Civil & Environmental Engineering from Utah State University, USA.

Career 
Srini Raju was the Founding CEO & MD of Dun & Bradstreet Satyam Software the in-house technology unit of Dun & Bradstreet, established in 1994, which focused on implementing large-scale IT projects for Dun & Bradstreet businesses. DBSS was later renamed as Cognizant.

Srini later became the Co-founder and Chairman of  iLabs Venture Capital Fund, a Private Equity (PE) firm based out of Hyderabad. 

Mr. Srini Raju founded iLabs Group in 2000. iLabs Group is one of the pioneers of the Investment Ecosystem in India. Over the years, it has grown its scope in terms of both Investment and Industry. Originally started as an Angel Investor, iLabs Capital has expanded into, Seed-Stage, Early-Stage and Growth-Stage Investments, as well as Re-Structures and Buy-Outs. Initially focused on technology and technology enabled Ventures, iLabs Capital has extended into Consumer Products & Services; Health Care; Skills-Development; Media and Entertainment; Corporate and Industrial Parks. Today, iLabs Group is one of the front-runners of the investment landscape in India.

Srini has over 35 years of experience in Information Technology, Venture Capital and Private Equity. Prior to iLabs Group, Srini was Founding CEO & MD of Dun & Bradstreet Satyam Software (later became Cognizant Technology Solutions) and Satyam Enterprise Solutions.

A number of iLabs Investee Companies have become Leading Companies in their respective areas. Sri City, a leading Industrial City started by iLabs Group is home to over 150 companies from 25 Countries and two of India's leading Universities.

Srini is passionate about Educations and Skills Development. He is a Founding Member & Member of Governing Council of International Institute of Information Technology (IIIT), Hyderabad; Industry Partner (Donor) & Member of Board of Governors of Indian Institute of Information Technology, Sri City; Executive Board Member of Indian School of Business (ISB) and Benefactor of Srini Raju Center for Networked Economy (SRITNE); Co-Sponsor (Donor) and Board Member of KREA University; and Founding-Member & Board Member of T-Hub, Hyderabad.; Chairman/President of The Institute of Public Health Sciences Hyderabad Society.

Professional affiliations 
Besides investing and mentoring young professionals and entrepreneurs, he is continuing to make large contributions to the cause of building Institutions of Excellence in the field of Management and Technology.

 Industry Partner (Donor) & Member of Board of Governors of Indian Institute of Information Technology, Sri City. IIITS was established in 2013 under the Government of India's Initiative to set up 20 Institutes across India, focusing on Information Technology. The Institute was set up by the Government of India – MHRD, Government of Andhra Pradesh and Industry Partners represented by Sri City Foundation as a Not-for-Profit Public-Private-Partnership.
 Member of the Executive Board of Indian School of Business. Srini Raju pledged to donate ₹35 crores towards developing a Research Centre in the areas of Information Technology and Networked Economy. Indian School of Business (ISB) named the IT research center as Srini Raju Centre for Information Technology and Networked Economy (SRITNE) at ISB.
 Member of Governing Board and Governing Council ; Founding Member of IIIT Hyderabad. In 10 years, IIIT has become India's leading Technology Research University. IIIT-H is a non-governmental Public Institution set up on Public-Private Partnership Model by Leading Tech Companies and the Government of Telangana.
 Co-Sponsor (Donor) and Board Member of KREA University. Krea University is a unique effort, specifically conceived and designed to address the unprecedented challenges and opportunities of the 21st century.
 Member & Board Member of T-Hub, Hyderabad. T-Hub is a unique public/private partnership between the government of Telangana, 3 of India's premier academic institutes (IIIT-H, ISB & NALSAR) and key private sector leaders. It stands at the intersection of the start-up, academic, corporate, research and government sectors.
 Srini Raju is also a visiting Faculty at various universities like ISB, IIIT Hyderabad, IIT Madras, IESE Business School-University of Navarre etc. 
 Srini Raju was also the member of the Steering Committee for conducting conferences by Confederation of Indian Industry (CII) jointly with Government of Andhra Pradeshduring IT Mega Event "GitexHyderabad 2003".
 Srini Raju is also an Advisory member of TIE Hyderabad. TIE Global is a nonprofit venture devoted to entrepreneurs in all industries, at all stages, from incubation, throughout the entrepreneurial lifecycle. With a global reach and a local focus, the heart of TiE efforts lies in its five foundational programs, – Mentoring, Networking, Education, Funding, and Incubation 
 Srini Raju is an Advisory Board member of Hyderabad Angels. Established in 2012, HA investors are leading venture capitalists, entrepreneurs and business leaders, who, with their financial and business acumen, are committed to providing support to the Indian and global start-up ecosystem.
 Srini Raju is Chairman of the Board of The Institute of Public Health Sciences Hyderabad Society (IPHSH). Established in 2021, IPHSH manages the governance of Indian Institue of Public Health- Hyderabad, IIPHH.

References

Businesspeople from Andhra Pradesh
Indian chief executives
Indian emigrants to the United States
Engineers from Andhra Pradesh
People from Hyderabad, India
20th-century Indian engineers
21st-century Indian engineers
Telugu people
Living people
1961 births
Chief executives in the technology industry